Gale Owen-Crocker (born 16 January 1947) is a professor emerita of the University of Manchester, England. Before her retirement she was Professor of Anglo-Saxon Culture and Director of the Manchester Centre for Anglo-Saxon Studies.

Early life and education
Gale Redfern Owen was born and raised in Newcastle upon Tyne, and earned a first class degree with honours in English language and literature from Newcastle University in 1968 and a PhD with a thesis on Anglo-Saxon dress in 1976, also from Newcastle.

Career
After teaching at her former school and at Newcastle University while a student, Owen then took up a teaching position at the University of Manchester, where she remained until retiring as Professor of Anglo-Saxon Culture and Director of the Manchester Centre for Anglo-Saxon Studies in 2015. She became Gale Owen-Crocker upon her marriage to Richard Crocker in 1981. She is now Professor Emerita.

Owen-Crocker co-founded and co-edited Volumes 1 through 14 of the journal Medieval Clothing and Textiles with Robin Netherton, and began a phased transition to the new editorial team in 2017 for Volume 15 and beyond. She was editor-in-chief for Brill's Encyclopaedia of Medieval Dress and Textiles of the British Isles c. 450-1450 (2012).

Owen-Crocker has published six monographs, including one that is a collection of her papers on the Bayeux Tapestry, as well as eighteen edited or co-edited books and over 150 articles on Anglo-Saxon culture and Medieval Dress and Textiles.

Her scholarship and her tireless and generous mentoring of other scholars have been honored in two publications: A Festschrift edited by Maren Clegg Hyer and Jill Frederick in 2016 entitled Textiles, Text, Intertext: Essays in Honour of Gale R. Owen-Crocker (Boydell Press), and Making Sense of the Bayeux Tapestry: Readings and Reworkings, co-edited by Anna C. Henderson and Gale R. Owen-Crocker (Manchester: Manchester University Press, 2016).

Owen-Crocker is a prolific lecturer and has been invited to speak at events all over the world. Her warm and lively yet thoroughly scholarly presentation style has garnered her invitations to speak at academic conferences and prestigious universities, but she is equally at home presenting to the general public and to groups of re-enactors.

Bibliography
"Wynflæd's Wardrobe", Anglo-Saxon England, vol 8, 1979, pp. 195–202.
Rites and Religions of the Anglo-Saxons. Newton Abbot: David & Charles, 1981.
Dress in Anglo-Saxon England. Manchester: Manchester UP, 1986.
Dress in Anglo Saxon England: Revised and Enlarged Edition. Woodbridge: Boydell Press, 2004.
The Four Funerals in Beowulf: and the structure of the poem. Manchester: Manchester UP, St Martins Press, 2000.
The Bayeux Tapestry: Collected Papers. Variorum Collected Studies Series. Farnham: Ashgate, 2012.
Medieval Textiles of the British Isles AD 450-1100: An Annotated Bibliography. With Elizabeth Coatsworth. British Archeological Reports, British Series 445. Oxford: Archaeopress, 2007.
Clothing the Past: Surviving Garments from Early Medieval to Early Modern Western Europe. With Elizabeth Coatsworth. Leiden: Brill, 2018.

References

External links
"The Lexis of Cloth and Clothing"

Living people
1947 births
People from Newcastle upon Tyne
British medievalists
Women medievalists
Anglo-Saxon studies scholars
Academics of the University of Manchester
Alumni of Newcastle University
British women historians